Ben Strong may refer to:

 Benjamin Strong Jr. (1872–1928), American banker
 Ben Strong (basketball) (born 1986), American basketball coach and player